Wang Qinghuan (born 22 December 1966) is a Chinese long-distance runner. She competed in the women's 10,000 metres at the 1988 Summer Olympics.

References

1966 births
Living people
Athletes (track and field) at the 1988 Summer Olympics
Chinese female long-distance runners
Olympic athletes of China
Place of birth missing (living people)